Natalia Adamovna Alimova Trandenkova (born 6 February 1978 in Saint Petersburg), is a  volleyball player from Russia.

She played for the Russia women's national volleyball team.
She participated in the 2005 Women's European Volleyball Championship, and 2007 Women's European Volleyball Championship.

Clubs

References

External links

1978 births
Living people
Russian women's volleyball players
Volleyball players at the 2008 Summer Olympics
Olympic volleyball players of Russia
20th-century Russian women
21st-century Russian women